Brute Corps is a 1971 American exploitation film. It was the directorial debut of Jerry Jameson.

Plot
Kevin, a draft dodging pacifist and Terry, a beautiful hitchhiker, travel to Mexico and encounter a gang of mercenaries awaiting their next mission.  Wicks, a psychotic mercenary, takes a liking to the woman and sets the couple on a brutal course of torture and pain.

Cast
Paul Carr - Ross
Joseph Kaufmann - Kevin
Alex Rocco - Wicks
Jennifer Billingsley - Terry
Michael Pataki - MacFarlane
Charles Macaulay - The Colonel
Roy Jenson - Quinn
Felton Perry - Hill
Joseph Bernard - Sheriff Alvarez
Parker West as Ballard

References

External links

1971 films
1970s exploitation films
American action thriller films
American exploitation films
1970s English-language films
Films directed by Jerry Jameson
1971 directorial debut films
1970s American films